Ipswich is a town and borough in Suffolk, England, of which it is the county town.

The Ipswich built-up area is the fourth-largest in East of England region and the 42nd in England and Wales. It includes the towns of Kesgrave, Woodbridge, Bramford and Martlesham Heath.

First recorded during the medieval period as Gippeswic, the town has also been recorded as Gyppewicus and Yppswyche. The town has been occupied continuously since the Saxon period, and is contested to be one of the oldest towns in the United Kingdom. The settlement was of great economic importance to the Kingdom of England throughout its history, particularly in trade, with the town's historical dock (Ipswich Waterfront) known as the largest and most important dock in the kingdom.

The town is divided into various quarters, with the town centre and the waterfront drawing the most footfall. The town centre is home to the town's retail shopping and the historic town square, the Cornhill. The waterfront is located south of the town centre on a meander of the River Orwell and is a picturesque setting housing the town's marina. The waterfront is a trendy area of the town housing luxury yachts, and lined with high-rise apartment buildings, restaurants and cafés. The waterfront is also home to the University of Suffolk campus.

Ipswich is surrounded by two Areas of Outstanding Natural Beauty (AONB): the Suffolk Coast and Heaths and Dedham Vale. The town has a tourist sector with 3.5 million people reported to have visited the town in 2016. In 2020, Ipswich was ranked as an emerging global tourist destination by TripAdvisor.

History

Ipswich is one of England's oldest towns, and is claimed to be the oldest still continuing town to have been established and developed by the English, with continuous settlement since early Anglo-Saxon times.

Roman settlement
Under the Roman empire, the area around Ipswich formed an important route inland to rural towns and settlements via the rivers Orwell and Gipping. A large Roman fort, part of the coastal defences of Britain, stood at Walton near Felixstowe (and the largest Roman villa in Suffolk (possibly an administrative complex) stood at Castle Hill (north-west Ipswich).

Middle Ages 

The modern town took shape in Anglo-Saxon times (7th–8th centuries) around the Port of Ipswich. As the coastal states of north-western Europe emerged from the collapse of the Roman Empire, essential North Sea trade and communication between eastern Britain and the continent (especially to Scandinavia, and through the Rhine) passed through the former Roman ports of London (serving the kingdoms of Mercia, the East Saxons, Kent) and York (Eoforwic) (serving the Kingdom of Northumbria).

Gipeswic (also in other spellings such as Gippeswich) arose as the equivalent to these, serving the Kingdom of East Anglia, its early imported wares dating to the time of King Rædwald, ruler of the East Angles (616–624). The famous ship-burial and treasure at Sutton Hoo nearby is probably his grave. The Ipswich Museum houses replicas of the Roman Mildenhall and Sutton Hoo treasures. A gallery devoted to the town's origins includes Anglo-Saxon weapons, jewellery and other artefacts.

The seventh-century town was centred near the quay. Around 700 AD, Frisian potters from the Netherlands area settled in Ipswich and set up the first large-scale potteries in England since Roman times. Their wares were traded far across England, and the industry was unique to Ipswich for 200 years. With growing prosperity, in about 720 AD a large new part of the town was laid out in the Buttermarket area. Ipswich was becoming a place of national and international importance. Parts of the ancient road plan still survive in its modern streets.

After the invasion of 869, Ipswich fell under Viking rule. The earth ramparts circling the town centre were probably raised by Vikings in Ipswich around 900 to prevent its recapture by the English. They were unsuccessful. The town operated a mint under royal licence from King Edgar in the 970s, which continued through the Norman Conquest until the time of King John, in about 1215. The abbreviation Gipes appears on the coins.

King John granted the town its first charter in 1200, laying the medieval foundations of its modern civil government. Thenceforth Ipswich strongly maintained its jurisdiction over the Liberty of Ipswich, an administrative area extending over about 35 square kilometres centred on the town.

In the next four centuries it made the most of its wealth. Five large religious houses, including two Augustinian Priories (St Peter and St Paul, and Holy Trinity, both mid-12th century), and those of the Ipswich Greyfriars (Franciscans, before 1298), Ipswich Whitefriars (Carmelites founded 1278–79) and Ipswich Blackfriars (Dominicans, before 1263), stood in medieval Ipswich. The last Carmelite Prior of Ipswich was the celebrated John Bale, author of the oldest English historical verse-drama (Kynge Johan, c.1538). There were also several hospitals, including the leper hospital of St Mary Magdalene, founded before 1199.

During the Middle Ages the Marian Shrine of Our Lady of Grace was a famous pilgrimage destination, and attracted many pilgrims including Henry VIII and Katherine of Aragon. At the Reformation the statue was taken away to London to be burned, though some claim that it survived and is preserved at Nettuno, Italy.

Around 1380, Geoffrey Chaucer satirised the merchants of Ipswich in The Canterbury Tales. Thomas Wolsey, the future cardinal, was born in Ipswich in 1473 as the son of a wealthy landowner. One of Henry VIII's closest political allies, he founded a college in the town in 1528, which was for its brief duration one of the homes of the Ipswich School. He remains one of the town's most famed figures.

Early-modern era 
During the 14th to 17th centuries Ipswich was a kontor for the Hanseatic League, the port being used for imports and exports to the Baltic.

In the time of Queen Mary the Ipswich Martyrs were burnt at the stake on the Cornhill for their Protestant beliefs. A monument commemorating this event now stands in Christchurch Park. Ipswich was a printing, bookseller centre, and an entrepôt for continental books in the 16th century. From 1611 to 1634 Ipswich was a major centre for emigration to New England. This was encouraged by the Town Lecturer, Samuel Ward. His brother Nathaniel Ward was first minister of Ipswich, Massachusetts, where a promontory was named 'Castle Hill' after the place of that name in north-west Ipswich, UK. Ipswich was also one of the main ports of embarkation for puritans leaving other East Anglian towns and villages for the Massachusetts Bay Colony during the 1630s and what has become known as the Great Migration. The painter Thomas Gainsborough lived and worked in Ipswich. In 1835, Charles Dickens stayed in Ipswich and used it as a setting for scenes in his novel The Pickwick Papers. The hotel where he resided first opened in 1518; it was then known as The Tavern and later became known as the Great White Horse Hotel. Dickens made the hotel famous in chapter XXII of The Pickwick Papers, vividly describing the hotel's meandering corridors and stairs.

In 1797 Lord and Lady Nelson moved to Ipswich, and in 1800 Lord Nelson was appointed High Steward of Ipswich.

19th and 20th centuries 

In 1824 Dr George Birkbeck, with support from several local businessmen, founded one of the first Mechanics' Institutes which survives to this day as the independent Ipswich Institute reading room and library. The building is located at 15 Tavern Street.

In the mid-19th century coprolite (fossilised animal dung) was discovered; the material was mined and then dissolved in acid, the resulting mixture forming the basis of Fisons fertiliser business.

The Tolly Cobbold brewery, built in the 18th century and rebuilt in 1894–96, is one of the finest Victorian breweries in the UK. There was a Cobbold brewery in the town from 1746 until 2002 when Ridley's Breweries took Tolly Cobbold over. Felix Thornley Cobbold presented Christchurch Mansion to the town in 1896. Smaller breweries include St Jude's Brewery, situated in an 18th-century coach-house near the town centre.

Ipswich was subject to bombing by German Zeppelins during World War I but the greatest damage by far occurred during the German bombing raids of World War II. The area in and around the docks were especially devastated. Eighty civilians died by enemy action in the Ipswich county borough area during the latter war. The last bombs to fall on Ipswich landed on Seymour Road at 2a.m. on 2 March 1945, killing 9 people and destroying 6 houses.

The Willis Building is a glass-clad building owned by Willis. Designed by Norman Foster, the building dates from 1974, when it was known as the Willis Faber & Dumas building. It became the youngest grade I listed building in Britain in 1991, being at the time one of only two listed buildings to be less than 30 years old.

In September 1993, Ipswich and Arras, Nord Pas-de-Calais, France, became twin towns, and a square in the new Buttermarket development was named Arras Square to mark the relationship.

Ipswich formerly had a municipal airport to the south-east of the town, which was opened in 1929 by the Ipswich Corporation. The airport was controversially closed in 1996. The site was redeveloped for housing as the Ravenswood estate.

21st century

Ipswich has experienced a building boom in the early part of the 21st century. Construction has mainly concentrated around the former industrial dock which is now known as the Ipswich Waterfront. Regeneration to the area has made it a hub of culture in Ipswich, the area boasts fine dining restaurants, a boutique hotel, and the new regional university, the University of Suffolk. The new high rise buildings of the Regatta Quay development has topped the list of the tallest buildings in Ipswich. The mixed-use high rise building, the Cranfield Mill, is currently the tallest building in East Anglia.

Ipswich has made several unsuccessful bids for city status. The town does not have a cathedral, so the Bishop of St Edmundsbury and Ipswich is based at Bury St Edmunds, the former county town of West Suffolk.

Localities
The waterfront is now devoted primarily to leisure use and includes extensive recent development of residential apartment blocks and a university campus. Businesses operated from the dock include luxury boats and a timber merchant. Other industries have been established to the south of the wet dock. The area was flooded in 2013 during a tidal surge. In February 2019 a flood gate, which protects the "New Cut", was unveiled. The flood barrier, similar in design to the Thames Barrier, cost £67m.
The Ipswich Village Development, begun in 2002 around Russell Road, is home to Suffolk County Council and Ipswich Borough Council. 
Holywells Ward, Ipswich is the area around Holywells Park, a 67-acre (27 ha) public park situated near the docks, and the subject of a painting by Thomas Gainsborough. Alexandra Park is the nearest park to the waterfront's northern quay, and situated on Back Hamlet, adjacent to University of Suffolk.

Localities outside the town centre include Bixley Farm, Broke Hall, California, Castle Hill, Chantry, The Dales, Gainsborough, Greenwich, Maidenhall, Pinewood, Priory Heath, Racecourse, Ravenswood (built on a former airfield), Rose Hill, Rushmere, Springvale, St Margarets, Stoke, Warren Heath, Westbourne, Whitehouse and Whitton.

To the east of the town is Trinity Park near Bucklesham the home of the annual Suffolk Show, a typical county show. The 'Trinity' is the name given to the three animals native to the county of Suffolk, namely Red Poll cattle, the powerful Suffolk Punch horse and the black-faced Suffolk sheep.

Culture

Ipswich is home to many artists and has a number of galleries, the most prominent of which are at Christchurch Mansion, the Town Hall, in Ancient House and the Artists' Gallery in Electric House. The visual arts are further supported with many sculptures at easily accessible sites. The Borough Council promotes the creation of new public works of art and has been known to make this a condition of planning permission. The town has three museums: Ipswich Museum, the Ipswich Transport Museum and Christchurch Mansion.

The New Wolsey Theatre is a 400-seat theatre situated on Civic Drive. Although the Wolsey Theatre was built in 1979, The New Wolsey Company took on the management and running of the Wolsey Theatre in 2000, opening its first production in February 2001.

DanceEast, which has the primary aim of advocating innovation and development of dance in the East of England is now resident in their new premises as part of the waterfront development. They are building new premises as part of the waterfront development. These are the first custom built dance facilities in the east of England at a cost of around £8 million.

Spill Festival of Performance was launched in Ipswich in 2007 and alternates between London and Ipswich yearly. In 2018, Clarion Call is the signature installation in the Festival Installed at the historic town centre and waterfront in Ipswich, Clarion Call is a sonic intervention calls out to the setting sun in daily incantations, its voices reflecting contemporary Britain while exploring the local history of the World War I, using audio technology originally employed in war and emergencies, and the voices and songs of women and girls, to create a soundscape of immense scale.

Eastern Angles Theatre Company is based at the Sir John Mills Theatre in Ipswich, named after the famous actor who lived in Felixstowe as a child. In 2012 it celebrated its 30th anniversary. The group engages in rural tours and seasonal performances.

The Ipswich Arts Festival, known as 'Ip-art' has been the town's annual summer arts festival since 2003 and seen a developing and varied programme of events from visual arts, performing arts, literature, film and music, notably a free music day in Christchurch Park.

The Ipswich Jazz Festival is a jazz music and arts festival started in 2015 in partnership with the Ipswich Arts Festival and mixes established jazz talent, rising stars and regional players.

Ipswich had a notable punk scene and influential grindcore band Extreme Noise Terror, formed in the town in 1985.

It also features art and photography exhibitions, film screenings and workshops held in venues across the town.

Norwich remains the regional centre for TV broadcasting, but both BBC East and Anglia TV have presenters and offices in Ipswich. The town has five local radio stations, BBC Radio Suffolk covering the entire county, where the East Anglian Accent can be heard on its many phone-ins, the commercial station Heart East which was founded in 1975 as Radio Orwell covering the A14 corridor in Suffolk, and Ipswich 102 who took over the FM frequency in 2018, until 2020 when it rebranded as Greatest Hits Radio Ipswich & Suffolk. Then in September 2022, the station was rebranded again as Nation Radio Suffolk where it has one local show on weekday afternoons 1pm-4pm, hosted by Rob Chandler (who hosted the local afternoon show prior to the rebrand). The younger audience is catered for with Suffolk-based Kiss 105-108. Ipswich Community Radio was launched in 2007. The town's daily newspaper is the Ipswich Star a sister title to the county's daily newspaper the East Anglian Daily Times.

Buildings

In addition to the Christchurch Mansion and Ancient House, Ipswich in the 21st century has some important cultural buildings including the New Wolsey Theatre and the Regent Theatre—the largest theatre venue in East Anglia where, in the 1960s, the Beatles performed when it was still known as the Gaumont.

There are several medieval Ipswich churches but the grandest is St. Mary-le-Tower, rebuilt by the Victorians. Holy Trinity Church by the waterfront is one of the few churches in the country which was built during the reign of William IV and whilst the outside looks plain, the interior is quite spectacular. The world's oldest circle of church bells is housed in St Lawrence Church.

The Ancient House in the Buttermarket is an example of a merchant house which features tudor pargeting and the Ipswich window.

The former East Suffolk County Hall is just east of the centre of Ipswich. It is listed as a building at risk by the Victorian Society. The Town Hall remains in use as an arts centre and events venue; it dates from 1866 (architects: Bellamy & Hardy of Lincoln). The 18th Century Grade II listed Old Post Office, which was built in 1881, has been renovated and is now home to the Botanist bar.

Modern buildings include Endeavour House (headquarters of Suffolk County Council and formerly home of the TXU Corporation), Grafton House (home of Ipswich Borough Council) and Ipswich Crown Court, all located on Russell Road in the area known as the Ipswich Village Development, which includes Portman Road stadium. The stadium has hosted England under-21, under-23, and international soccer matches, as well as rugby union and hockey matches.

In the waterfront area The Mill is the tallest building in East Anglia, reaching 23 storeys.

On the north-west side of Ipswich lies Broomhill Pool, a Grade II listed Olympic-sized lido which opened in 1938 and closed in 2002, since which time a campaign to see it restored and re-opened has been run by the Broomhill Pool Trust. On the southern side of Ipswich is historic Belstead Lodge, now the Belstead Brook Hotel.

Governance

Ipswich is governed locally by a two-tier council system. Ipswich Borough Council fulfils district council functions such as refuse collection, housing and planning and Suffolk County Council provides the county council services such as transport, education and social services.

The town is covered by two parliamentary constituencies: Ipswich, which is represented by Conservative MP Tom Hunt and covers about 75% of the town, and Central Suffolk & North Ipswich, which covers the remaining 25% and is represented by Conservative MP Dan Poulter.

In April 2006 the borough council initiated public discussions about the idea of turning the borough into a unitary authority; Ipswich had constituted a county borough from 1889 to 1974, independent of the administrative county of East Suffolk, and this status was not restored by the Banham/Cooksey Commission in the 1990s. Ipswich, Norwich, Exeter and Oxford united to campaign for unitary authority status for the four towns, hoping to use the window of opportunity presented by the October 2006 Local Government White Paper. In March 2007, it was announced that Ipswich was one of 16 shortlisted councils and on 25 July 2007, the secretary of state announced that she was minded to implement the unitary proposal for Ipswich, but that there were 'a number of risks relating to the financial case set out in the proposal', on which she invited Ipswich to undertake further work before a final decision was taken. Early in December plans were thrown into doubt as the government announced that it had "delayed" the unitary bids for Ipswich and Exeter. In July 2008 the Boundary Committee announced its preferred option was for a unitary authority covering Ipswich and the south eastern corner of Suffolk, including Felixstowe.

Industry

Being the county town of agricultural Suffolk, industry around Ipswich has had a strong farming bias with Ransomes, Sims & Jefferies Ltd, one of the most famous agricultural manufacturers, located in the town. It is notable that the world's first commercial motorised lawnmower was built by Ransomes in 1902. Ransomes & Rapier was a major British manufacturer of railway equipment and later cranes, from 1869 to 1987. There was a sugar beet factory at Ipswich for many years; it was closed in 2001 as part of a rationalisation by British Sugar. This agricultural link is preserved in the local football club's nickname "The Tractor Boys". Phillips & Piper Ltd on Old Foundry Road employed many women who sewed equestrian and hunt jackets for Harrods, Pytchley, and other labels for 130 years, finally closing down in June 1982.

The British Telecom Research Laboratories were located to the east of the town in 1975 at Martlesham Heath; it is now a science park called Adastral Park. The area was originally RAF Martlesham Heath, a World War II airfield. Part of the old airfield is now the site of Suffolk Constabulary's police headquarters.

A key employment sector is insurance, both wholesale and retail sectors. Some of the major players with a key presence in Ipswich include Axa, Churchill, Legal & General, LV and Willis Towers Watson. Access to a skilled and experienced workforce has also led to the establishment of ancillary businesses serving these companies, including call centres dealing with sales and claims.

Ipswich is one of the Haven ports and is still a working port, handling several million tonnes of cargo each year. Prior to decommissioning, HMS Grafton was a regular visitor to the port and has special links with the town and the county of Suffolk. HMS Orwell, named after the river, is also closely linked with Ipswich.

Demography

Ethnicity

Religion

Transport

Railway
The town has two railway stations: Ipswich and Derby Road. It is situated on the Great Eastern main line from London to Norwich, the East Suffolk line to Lowestoft and the Felixstowe branch line. Trains in Ipswich are run by Greater Anglia, which operates direct services to cities in the region including London, Cambridge, Chelmsford, Norwich and Peterborough.

The town's railway engine shed opened in 1846 and closed in 1968. Ipswich is still a signing-on point for locomotive crews and a stabling point.

Buses
Bus services in Ipswich are operated by Ipswich Buses, First Norfolk & Suffolk, Beestons and several smaller companies. Town services operate mainly from Tower Ramparts bus station and regional services from the Ipswich Old Cattle Market bus station.

Roads
Ipswich is located close to the A12 and the A14 roads. The Orwell Bridge which carries the A14 road over the River Orwell is an important bridge for the region which connects the Port of Felixstowe to the rest of the country. The bridge is occasionally closed as a result of incidents or high winds; the closure of the bridge brings Ipswich to a standstill with diverted traffic.

Air
Ipswich Airport was closed in 1996, but the town is an hour away from Stansted Airport.

Other
Ipswich is approximately 40 minutes away from Harwich international port and is also on Sustrans's National Cycle Route 1 and National Cycle Route 51. The port of Felixstowe is a major container port  to the east.

Sport

Ipswich's sole professional association football club is Ipswich Town, which was established in 1878 and, plays in the third-tier EFL League One at the 30,300-capacity Portman Road stadium. Elected to the Football League in 1938, they have a strong rivalry with Norwich City, and were the previous club of the two most successful England managers; Alf Ramsey, who was buried in the Old Cemetery in the town on his death in 1999, and Bobby Robson. Ipswich won the First Division title in 1961–62 in their first season as a top division club during Ramsey's reign, as well as the 1978 FA Cup and the 1981 UEFA Cup under Robson. The club are also undefeated at home in all European competitions, having won 25 and drawn six of 31 matches.

Ipswich is also home to several non-League football clubs, including Ipswich Wanderers and Whitton United in the Eastern Counties League, and Achilles, Crane Sports, and Ransomes Sports among others in the Suffolk & Ipswich League. The town has representation in both codes of rugby. There are two rugby union teams – Ipswich RFC, who play in London 2 North East League, and Ipswich YM RUFC – and one rugby league side – Ipswich Rhinos, who play in the Rugby League Conference. Ipswich Cardinals are an American football team, playing in the South-East Conference of BAFACL 1; the second tier of the BAFA Community Leagues.

The speedway team, the Ipswich Witches, have ridden at Foxhall Stadium on the outskirts of Ipswich since 1951 and have won the top-tier league title four times, the knock-out cup five times and the second-tier knock-out cup twice. The stadium is also used regularly for Hot Rod, Stock Car and Banger racing events, hosting major events throughout the year on the stadium's outer tarmac oval.

Ipswich Gymnastics Centre is one of only three fully Olympic accredited gymnastics facilities in the UK. Ipswich Swimming, formed in 1884 as Ipswich Swimming Club, is based at the town's Crown Pools, and also uses the Fore Street swimming pool. The most successful club member is World Championship gold medallist Karen Pickering.

Ipswich had a racecourse which ran a mix of flat and National Hunt races.

Education

Schools

State-funded secondary schools include comprehensive schools such as Copleston High School, St Alban's Catholic High School, Holbrook Academy, Holbrook Primary and Northgate High School and academies such as Ipswich Academy and Chantry Academy. Ipswich is also home to several independent schools, including Royal Hospital School, Ipswich School (both are co-educational and members of the Headmasters' and Headmistresses' Conference), Ipswich High School (has recently changed from girls only to girls and boys) and St Joseph's College (Catholic, co-educational) which hosts an international summer camp.

Further and higher education
Suffolk New College is a further education college located in Ipswich, serving students from the town and wider area. There is also a sixth form college, One, which serves students from the same area.

Ipswich is the location of the University of Suffolk, Suffolk's first Higher Education Institution (HEI), established in 2007. It was originally University Campus Suffolk, a collaborative venture involving the University of Essex in Colchester, the University of East Anglia in Norwich, various further education colleges and Suffolk County Council. However, the university was granted its own degree awarding powers in November 2015, and in May 2016 it was awarded university status. The university was renamed to the University of Suffolk in August 2016, prior to its former name University Campus Suffolk.

Climate
Ipswich experiences an oceanic climate, like the rest of the British Isles, with a narrow range of temperature and rainfall spread evenly throughout the year.

In an average year, 55.33 nights will report an air frost. The lowest temperature to be recorded in recent years was  during December 2010.

As with much of East Anglia, rainfall is low, averaging 569.3mm in a typical year, with 103.8 days of the year reporting over 1mm of rain. All averages refer to the period 1971–2000.

It has a slightly more marine climate than East Bergholt, with slightly lower highs and milder lows throughout the year in the 1981–2010 average period. It is slightly less prone to frosts, averaging 35.5 such occurrences in a calendar year. Sunshine levels at 1,707.7 hours per annum are relatively high for the British Isles, but not abnormal for southern parts of England.

People

The Tudor Cardinal Thomas Wolsey was born in the town. Sir Samuel Mayart, the judge and political theorist, was born in Ipswich in 1585. The artist Thomas Gainsborough and the cartoonist "Giles" worked here, Horatio, Lord Nelson, became Steward of Ipswich, and Margaret Catchpole began her adventurous career here. Alf Ramsey and Bobby Robson were both successful managers of Ipswich Town. Ipswich was the birthplace in 1741 of Sarah Trimmer, née Kirby, writer and critic of children's literature and among the first to introduce pictorial material and animals and the natural world into it. Also born in Ipswich is Sam Claflin, who appeared in The Hunger Games and Peaky Blinders.

Actor and director Richard Ayoade, best known for his role as Maurice Moss in The IT Crowd, was brought up in Ipswich, as was the ceramic artist Blanche Georgiana Vulliamy,
and the musician Nandi Bushell.
Hugh Catchpole (OBE, CBE, Hilal-i-Imtiaz), a noted educationist with over 60 years of association with military schools and colleges in India and Pakistan, was born in Ipswich.

Twin towns
Ipswich is twinned with:

  Arras, France, since 1994

In popular culture
 In Serena Valentino's Villains novel Poor Unfortunate Soul: A Tale of the Sea Witch, Ursula appears in the town of Ipswich and proceeds to turn the citizens of the town into twisted sea creatures, reminiscent of the horror tales of author HP Lovecraft. She is stopped upon the arrival of King Triton.
 In the Dead Parrot sketch by Monty Python's Flying Circus, the Customer was sent to Bolton for a replacement but was falsely told he was in Ipswich: "C: This is Bolton, is it? O: (with a fake moustache) No, it's Ipswich."

See also

 List of college towns
 List of English districts
 List of locations in Australia with an English name
 List of tallest buildings and structures in Ipswich
 List of towns in England
 List of U.S. places named after non-U.S. places

References

External links

 Ipswich Borough Council
Medieval town plan of Ipswich Town

 
Towns in Suffolk
County towns in England
Non-metropolitan districts of Suffolk
Port cities and towns of the North Sea
River Orwell
Trading posts of the Hanseatic League
Unparished areas in Suffolk
Populated places established in the 1st millennium
Former civil parishes in Suffolk
Boroughs in England